Gabriel Berthomieu, known also by his nickname Hugues, (born in Graulhet, 15 February 1924- Albi, 6 July 1997) was a French rugby league and union player who played as second row.

1,78 metres tall and weighing 97kg, he started as lock for Sporting Club Graulhétois and later, switched codes to league playing for Racing Club Albi. He also represented France at the 1957 Rugby League World Cup.

Rugby union career

Club 

 SC Graulhet

Honours 

 Junior French Champion for SC Graulhet

Junior representative (Pyrénées-Béarn-Bigorre)

France national team

Rugby league career

Club 

 Albi XIII

Honours 

 French Champion with Albi in 1956 and 1958

France national team 

 International (39 caps) 1946-1949, 1951-1953, 1955-1957
 2 Australia and New Zealand tours in 1955 and 1957
 Champion of the European Cup of Nations : 1949 and 1952 (France).

He was also Captain for France during certain matches.

References

External links 

 Gabriel Berthomieu profile at rugbyleagueproject.com

1924 births
1997 deaths
France national rugby league team captains
France national rugby league team players
Racing Club Albi XIII players
Rugby league second-rows
Rugby union locks
Sporting Club Graulhetois players
Sportspeople from Tarn (department)
French rugby league players